Lentibacillus kapialis is a Gram-positive, strictly aerobic and moderately halophilic bacterium from the genus of Lentibacillus which has been isolated from fermented shrimp paste from Thailand.

References

Bacillaceae
Bacteria described in 2007